Saver or savers may refer to:

Saver (manhwa), a Korean manhwa by Eun-Young Lee
The Saver, 2015 Canadian drama film, written and directed by Wiebke von Carolsfeld
Saver return, a type of train ticket in the United Kingdom
Kaman KSA-100 SAVER (Stowable Aircrew Vehicle Escape Rotorseat), a gyroplane
Savers, a U.S. thrift store chain
Savers (UK retailer), a U.K. discount store chain
Cheongju KB Savers, a South Korean women's basketball team

See also

Captain Saver, a 1992 Taito videogame
Savères, a commune in Haute-Garonne department, France
Savior (disambiguation)
Savor (disambiguation)
SAVR (disambiguation)
Save (disambiguation)